The Kangaroo Point Green Bridge is an under-construction pedestrian and cyclist bridge across the Brisbane River in Brisbane, Australia. The bridge will connect the suburb of Kangaroo Point with the Brisbane CBD.

The design concept for the bridge is a single-mast cable stayed structure which will align the Alice Street - Edward Street intersection in the City with Scott Street, Kangaroo Point north from the Thornton Street ferry wharf. Construction was awarded in 2021 to BESIX Group's Australian subsidiary, BESIX Watpac.

Proposed design features 
 Design: Single-mast cable stayed structure
 Length: 
 Width: 
 Height: Clearance for River Vessels  from high water level to the bridge deck (same height as Victoria and Captain Cook bridges)

History
The bridge construction was included in the Brisbane City Master Plan 2014 as a priority project. It was expected that the construction of the bridge would be completed within five years. On 31 October 2016, council commenced geotechnical investigative works.

In August 2018, the state government offered funding to the city council to develop a business case.

In November 2020 the Brisbane City Council released Draft Reference Design Consultation Report for the bridge. Preliminary business case for the project is expected in late 2021.

Construction of the bridge will begin later this year and is expected to be completed in 2023.

See also
Bridges over the Brisbane River

References

External links
 Kangaroo Point Green Bridge - Brisbane City Council
 Bridge design at the Richard Kirk Architect web page

Proposed bridges in Australia
Bridges in Brisbane
Bridges over the Brisbane River
Kangaroo Point, Queensland
Brisbane central business district
Cable-stayed bridges in Australia